Chinese auspicious ornaments in textile and clothing refers to any form of Chinese auspicious ornaments, which are used to decorate various forms of Chinese textile and clothing (including  and ), fashion accessories, and footwear in China since the ancient times. Chinese auspicious ornaments form part of Chinese culture and hold symbolic meanings. In ancient China, auspicious ornaments were often either embroidered or woven into textile and clothing. Auspicious symbols and motifs continue to be used in present day China in industries, such as home textiles and clothing; they are also used in modern design packaging and interior design. Some of these Chinese auspicious ornaments were also culturally appropriated by European countries during the era of Chinoiserie, where they became decorative patterns on fashionable chinoiserie fashion and textiles.

Cultural significance 
Chinese auspicious patterns and motifs have profound meanings and are rich in forms; these reflect the desires and yearning of the ancient Chinese to pursue a better life. Chinese auspicious ornaments are typically decorations of Chinese cultural origins which are rooted in Confucianism, Taoism, Chinese Buddhism beliefs, in Chinese mythology and cosmology and concepts, as well from Buddhist visual arts and from the natural flora and fauna in China. Throughout Chinese history, the use of Chinese embroideries on textile, clothing, and footwear also reflected and expressed the subtle changes in aesthetic concepts, cultural traditions, ethics and morals of the Chinese people throughout the millennia.

Usage

Common items 
Chinese auspicious symbols and patterns were used on wedding bedding textiles. They were also used to decorate Chinese fragrant sachet (e.g. Qingyang sachet) and Chinese purses.

Garments and clothing accessories 
Clothing and colour in China also played an important role in representing its wearer's identity, rank, and culture. Clothing which were decorated with Chinese dragons and cosmological symbols, rank badges were typically symbol of status of the ruling class in ancient China.

Auspicious set of ornaments

Twelve ornaments 

The Twelve ornaments are one of the oldest motifs in China. They originated in the Western Zhou dynasty and was a group of highly auspicious ancient Chinese symbols and designs, signifying authority and power. They were typically embroidered on imperial clothing, and were used as decoration on textile fabrics.

Their use on clothing have been recorded in the Shangshu Yiji; since then, they have continuously been used. The system of clothing patterns was however established in the Han dynasty, where the types and the number of ornaments was regulated based on a person's ranks. In the Sui dynasty, the twelve ornaments were reserved for the Emperor exclusively; Emperor Yang Sui established a system which defined the exact location of these ornaments on the imperial robes. This system continued in the Ming dynasty. The system was changed in the Qing dynasty when the Manchu established their own clothing system. The emperor wore all twelve ornaments on his clothing.

Bagua 
Bagua are believed to be derived from the markings on the back of a tortoise shell after it had been placed on sacrificial fire.

Yin and Yang 
Yin and yang are also used to decorate clothing, including  and headwear.

Eight treasures 
The Eight treasures (八宝 bābǎo) can appear on clothing and textile. These motifs were typically used by Confucianists.

Eight emblems of the Immortals 
The eight emblems of the Immortals are typically eight items representing the Eight Immortals and their powers can also appear on clothing and textile. These motifs were typically used by taoists.

Ashtamangala/ Eight Sacred Buddhist Symbols 
The Ashtamangala can also appear on clothing, such as the dragon robes of the Qing dynasty. These motifs were typically used by buddhists.

Other sets of ornaments

List natural landscape elements used in textile and clothing

Clouds/ auspicious clouds 

Clouds, also referred as auspicious clouds (xiangyun 祥云), are the symbols of good fortune and happiness, as well as a good omen of peace and the symbol of heavens. Clouds designs have been used in artworks as early as the Eastern Zhou dynasty. in the ancient times, auspicious clouds were of associated with deities and good fortune.

Mountains and rocks 

Mountains were symbolism of stability, greatness, and stable governance.

Mountains are also one of the twelve ornaments which are embroidered on the Imperial robes. The rock found in the bottom-centre of the Qing dragon robes, represents the sacred mountain (山, shān), one of the Twelve ornaments.

Stars and constellation 
Stars were typically represented by small circles. When several stars (circles) are connected with lines, they became a constellation.

Sun 
On the Qing dynasty rank badge (buzi), the sun disk is typically depicted as a red disc, which represents the emperor.

In the Qing dynasty, animals, birds and creatures on a rank badges need to face the sun disc as symbol of loyalty to the Emperor.

Xingchen/ Three stars 
Xingchen (星辰), is depicted as several small circle, symbolizes the indefinite Universe. The number 3 has the meaning of having made everything and formed the beginning of things; this belief comes from Laozi, who said that the universe made the original matter of the Earth.

Waves and tides

Trees and plants

Pine tree 
Evergreen pine tree was a symbol of longevity.

Flowers 
Chrysanthemum

Chrysanthemum flowers symbolize longevity and autumn season. They could be used to decorate the garments of women.

Lotus flowers

Lotus flowers are symbols of purity and fruitfulness. Double lotus are wishes for blessing marriage and harmony.

Peach blossoms

Peach blossoms are symbols of spring season and happiness.

Peony flowers

Peony flowers are symbols of prosperity, wealth, and honour; they also a symbol of spring and feminine beauty. Peonies are often used on Chinese women's clothing.

Plum blossoms

Plum blossoms are symbol of winter season as it blooms in the cold. They are also one of the most famous flowers in China and are common perceived as a symbol of longevity. It is used as decoration to decorate , Chinese opera costumes as it is an indicator of wisdom and feminine charm.

Seeds 

Fruits 
The combination of longevity peaches, bergamot, and pomegranate represents multiple children and longevity.

Gourds
A gourd is a symbol of fertility. Doubles gourds are associated with immortals and deities.
PeachesA peach is a symbol of longevity; peaches were also associated with the deity Shoulao (God of longevity).

Pomegranate
A pomegranate is an auspicious pattern which represents the "abundance in all things" (especially, sons). It can also symbolize multiple children or offspring multiplied.

Mushroom 

Lingzhi mushroom can be used on clothing, such as court clothing. The auspicious characteristics of the lingzhi mushroom is a unique aspect in Chinese culture and were even worshipped in ancient times.According ancient Taoist belief, the consumption of lingzhi allows one to never grow old and die. Confucian scholars have been referring to the Lingzhi as "fortune herb" or "fortune grass" since the Han dynasty and considered the circular lines on the lingzhi cap as an auspicious symbol (or as fortune halos). Lingzhi is therefore a symbol of Longevity, luck, fortune, peace, prosperity.

Auspicious mammal animals 
Many animal motifs are found on Chinese textile and are often found in combined with cloud designs. Textile patterns with animals and clouds have been popular, especially during the Han to the Jin dynasty around the 1st to the 3rd century.

Bats 

Chinese bat motifs often look like a butterfly. A bat is a symbol of happiness. Bats have an auspicious meaning as the Chinese words for  sounds similar to the phrase "abundant good fortune".

Bats can be coupled with the Chinese character , written as《卐》and/or《卍》in Chinese characters, to expresses "ten thousand-fold wishes for good fortune and happiness".

Five bats represent five types of good fortune, called the Five blessings, which are good health, good wealth, longevity, love of virtue and a natural/ peaceful death.

Deer 
A deer is a symbol of longevity.

Lions 

The Chinese admired lions for their strength and courage; therefore, lions became associated with military and hunting prowess; they were typically found on the military rank badges on the Ming and Qing dynasties.

Rabbits 
Rabbits, especially white rabbits, are symbols of longevity. Textiles which show a rabbit motif are strongly associated with women and the moon (yin forces) and therefore, textiles with a rabbit on it would typically only be worn by women and eunuchs.

Yuetu/ Yutu/ Moon rabbit 

Yuetu (lit. "moon rabbit"), also known as yutu (jade rabbit) is a symbol of the moon. According to ancient Chinese legends, the moon rabbit (and/or rabbits) lived on the moon. Following this ancient belief, rabbits which run amongst clouds are intended to symbolize the moon.

The moon rabbit is one of the Twelve Ornaments, which adorn the Emperor's imperial robe; it is depicted as a rabbit in a disc, which represents the moon.

Tigers 

Tigers were symbols of masculinity and was seen as a fighting power as the Lord of the animal kingdom. Tiger heads are often found in Xifu where it is used to decorate military costumes.

Auspicious birds 
On textiles, birds were often inspired by paintings, literature, and by observation the natural surroundings; textiles which show birds paired with flowers originated from  paintings, which were already popular during the Tang dynasty before gaining more social significance near the end of the Northern Song dynasty.

Birds have an important place in Chinese culture as they are perceived as divine envoys and the heralds of auspicious events. Birds were associated with a noble character while pairs of birds were sometimes associated with marital relationship between spouses. The depiction of a crane with a phoenix, a mandarin duck, a heron, and a wagtail represents the 5 interpersonal relations according to Confucian beliefs.

Crane birds 

A crane bird is generally a symbol of longevity, immortality and wisdom. They can also express wishes of becoming a higher official. Motif of crane with a peach of immortality in its beaks, crane with lingzhi in its beak, crane paired with bottle gourds are all symbols of longevity.

A pair of cranes expresses desire for a long matrimonial life.

Two cranes flying toward the sun are a symbol of ambition.

Mandarin ducks 

A mandarin duck (yuanyang 鴛鴦) is a symbol of love and loyalty.

Mandarin ducks are also a symbol of marital fidelity and can be used on the clothing of brides.

Pairs of mandarin ducks were symbols of conjugal bliss and even appear on the clothing of brides. Pairs of mandarin ducks also symbolize peace, prosperity, marital stability and devotion due to the belief that mandarin ducks pair up for life and would die if they were to be separated.

Peacocks 

A peacock (孔雀 kongque) represents elegance, dignity and beauty. It is also the symbol of the sun, virtue, love, and the power of the civil officials in the Imperial court.

Pheasants

Colourful pheasants/ Huachong 

Huachong is a colourful pheasant. It is also one of the twelve symbols. It is used on the imperial clothing of the Emperor and on the Diyi. On the clothing of the Emperor, it represents the emperor's abundant knowledge, peace, and elegance.

Golden pheasants 
A golden pheasant (jinji 金雞) symbolizes duties and obligations.

Silver pheasants 
Silver pheasant (baixian 白鷴) is a symbol of beauty and happiness.

Other birds

Egrets or heron 

Lu (鹭) symbolized a route or a path.

When lu is paired with lotuses, it is represents the Confucian ideal of what an uncorrupted official is; it can also have the meaning as "recurring success on the path to career" where Lu is the path and the official gratification and the lotus represents the "recurring" characteristic.

Paradise flycatcher 

Paradise flycatcher (shoudai niao 绶带鸟) with its long tail looking like ribbons represents longevity due to its name having the word 'shou' being the homonym of shou (longevity) and 'dai' being the homophone of dai (代) which means generation; thus expressing the wishes for longevity for the family's generation.

Quail 
A quail (anchun 鵪鶉) symbolizes courage and is a symbol of peace.

Wild geese 
A wild goose (dayan 大雁 or e 鹅) symbolizes loyalty, fidelity, and marital bliss.

Auspicious fish, reptiles, and amphibians

Fish 
Fish are typically uses as a symbolism for wealth and abundance; the word fish yu is a homonym for the word abundance yu.

Reptiles

Tortoise 
Tortoises are symbols of longevity.

Auspicious insects

Butterflies 
The butterfly is a symbol of conjugal happiness.

Combination of different animal categories

Cat and butterfly 
The combination of a cat and a butterfly symbolizes the longevity of old people.

Chinese dragons (including python) 

Chinese dragons, long, are the national totem of the Chinese people; they are the most majestic symbols and are a symbol of authority, nobleness, honour, luck and success. According to Chinese cosmology, the Heavens are divided into nine palaces; and each of these nine palaces are ruled by a dragon. These nine dragons are often depicting as either ascending to or descending from the sky; they are also the symbolism of the dynamic powers of the Universe.

Chinese dragons are crucial elements on Chinese imperial clothing and appeared on the imperial court clothing at the end of the 7th century and became the symbol of the Chinese emperors in the Song dynasty. Chinese dragons continued to be used in the Qing dynasty in the imperial and court clothing. The types of dragons and their numbers of claws were regulated and prescribed by the imperial court. When Chinese dragons are enclosed in roundels, they are referred as tuanlong (团龙); they can also be enclosed in mandarin square (buzi).

The Chinese dragons originally had three claws in the Tang and Song dynasties, but the definition of Chinese dragons in China eventually shifted, and were regulated and institutionalized. It was therefore formally established that the Chinese dragons should have 5-clawed in the Ming and Qing dynasties while the 4-clawed dragon were no longer considered to be dragons, but mang (蟒, lit. "python").

Only the Emperor of China and some members of the imperial family were allowed to wear five-clawed dragons motifs which matched with the definition of Chinese dragons at those times. Other people wore other forms of dragon-like creatures, which were no longer considered as being Chinese dragons according to the contemporary standard. According to Shen Defu, a bureaucrat in the Ming dynasty, "the mang robe [蟒服, lit. "python robe"] is a garment with an image close to a dragon, similar to the dragon robe of the top authority (the emperor), except for the deduction of one claw". Clothing with 4-clawed Chinese dragon-like creatures were mangfu, feiyufu and douniufu; feiyu and douniu have additional specific characteristics which differ them from both the mang and the long. When the Ming dynasty court would bestow robes upon other chieftains, they would bestow four-clawed dragons; lesser princes, nobles and senior court officials of the Ming dynasty were also prescribed mang.

Xinglong/ travelling dragon/ moving dragon 

Xinlong (行龙) are curled body dragons that run horizontally with a sideways facing body and feet pointed downward, giving the appearance that they are walking or running.

Dragon playing with (flaming) pearl or ball 
A common motif used in clothing and other arts products is the dragon playing with flaming pearls (or balls), which appeared during the second half of the first 1st millennium AD. The flaming ball or ball represents either the sun or the moon; it is sometimes referred as the "day or night shining pearl".

Lilong/ standing dragon 
Lilong (立龙), or standing dragon, is a dragon with curved standing body, with its head in profile (facing a side). The legs are splayed limbs and well distributed on 4 sides.

Sitting dragon/ front-facing dragon 
Sitting dragon (zhenglong 正龙) or front-facing dragonis a dragon with a curved body with its head facing front with splayed limbs. The legs are well distributed on 4 sides. The body have 7 bends.

Jianglong/ descending dragon 
Jianglong (降龙) or descending dragons are curling dragons which appear to be descending vertically.

Shenglong/ ascending dragon 
Shenglong (升龙) or ascending dragons (爬龍) are curling dragons which appear to be ascending vertically.

Confronted dragons 

Confronted dragons are two dragons facing toward each other and moving toward the same direction.

/ phoenix 

 symbolizes everything good and everything beautiful, peace, good fortune, and feminine beauty.

It is often found on the clothing of women. The  is also the symbol of the empress and represent the  principle in the Yin and Yang philosophical concept.

Double phoenix 

In the Ming dynasty, double phoenix were used in the rank badges were used by female member of the imperial household.

/ Flying dragon and Dancing phoenix 
 is an auspicious ornaments which symbolizes marital bliss.

symbolizes good luck for an empire; it is also the symbol of virtue and perfection. Prior to 1662,  was used to decorate clothing of the nobles.

Sun crow

Sanzuwu/ Three-legged crow 
According to Chinese legends and mythology, the sanzuwu lived on the sun and was perceived as the envoy who operated the sun; since the ancient Chinese people worshipped the sun, the sanzuwu was worshipped as a symbol of happiness and comfort. The sanzuwu is one of the Twelve Ornaments, which adorn the Emperor's imperial robe.

List of Chinese characters used in textile and clothing 

Textiles and clothes in China could be decorated with auspicious Chinese characters.

Fu 

Fu (福) means fortune or blessing.

Ji 
Ji (吉) means good luck. Inscriptions such as Ji (吉) and daji (大吉) have appeared very early on in ancient China and even appeared on unearthed oracle bones. The character ji could be used to decorate dragon robes in the Qing dynasty.

Shou 

Shou《壽》means longevity. The stylized character of shou can also be used to decorate women's garments.

The Chinese character shou can also be combined with Chinese character wan, written as《卐》or《卍》.

Wan 

The Chinese character wan, written as《卐》or《卍》, is similar to the swastika. It is a symbol of immortality. It was adopted from a Buddhist symbol. It was declared as the source of all good fortune in 693 by Wu Zetian who called it wan.

Wan sounds the same as "ten thousand" or  "infinity"; as such adding wan to another symbol pattern multiplies that wish 10,000 times. It can be combined with other Chinese characters such as shou (longevity).

Xi 
The character xi  (喜) means happiness.

Xi/ double happiness 

The character xi  (囍) or double happiness is a pattern which expresses blessing marriage and harmony.

List of objects used in textile and clothing

Coins 
Coins are symbol of wealth.

Precious gems/ stones

Coral 

A twig of coral symbolizes long age and career

Pearl or flaming pearl 
Pearls (baozhu) is symbol of good fortune (wealth); it was used to decorate clothing. According to Chinese belief, pearls embodied the yin essence of the moon and would protect them from the yang essence of the sun. Pearls are often depicted with the imperial dragon as according to the legend, the dragon guards a peal under the water. The pearl is one of the Eight treasures and regularly appears on textiles and rank badge. By the mid-Qing dynasty, the pearl evolved into the flaming pearl. The flaming pearl represents the sun, wisdom, power and an imperial treasure.

Ball or flaming ball 
The ball or flaming ball represents either the sun or the moon; it is sometimes referred as the "day or night shining pearl".

Animal-based objects

Rhinoceros horn 
Rhinoceros horn is a symbol of virtue.

Literacy objects 
Scrolls are symbol of learning.

Related concepts 
 List of Chinese symbols, designs, and art motifs
 Five colours
 Five blessings
 Chinese numerology

See also 
 Traditional patterns of Korea
 Chinese ornamental gold silk
 Chinese embroidery

Notes

References 

Chinese traditional clothing
Chinese art
Chinese folk art
Chinese traditions
Chinese iconography